Markvartice may refer to:

 Markvartice (Jihlava District)
 Markvartice (Děčín District)
 Markvartice (Třebíč District)
 Markvartice (Jičín District)